Gadsden County is a county located in the panhandle of the U.S. state of Florida. As of the 2020 census, the population was 43,826. Its county seat is Quincy. Gadsden County is included in the Tallahassee, FL Metropolitan Statistical Area. Gadsden County is the only majority (over 50%) African-American county in Florida.

History
Gadsden County was created in 1823. It was named for James Gadsden of South Carolina, who served as Andrew Jackson's aide-de-camp in Florida in 1818. Gadsden County is historically known for its tobacco crop which is obsolete today.

Geography

Gadsden County is part of the Tallahassee Metropolitan Statistical Area.  Gadsden County is in the Eastern Time Zone.  Its western border with Jackson County forms the boundary in this area between the Eastern and Central Time Zones.

Adjacent counties
 Decatur County, Georgia - north
 Seminole County, Georgia - north
 Grady County, Georgia - northeast
 Leon County, Florida - east
 Liberty County, Florida - southwest
 Calhoun County, Florida - southwest (CST)
 Jackson County, Florida - northwest (CST)

Demographics

2020 census

Note: the US Census treats Hispanic/Latino as an ethnic category. This table excludes Latinos from the racial categories and assigns them to a separate category. Hispanics/Latinos can be of any race.

Gadsden County is unique in Florida in that it is the state's only county with an African American majority population.

2010 Census
As of the 2010 United States Census, there were 46,389 people living in the county. 56.0% were Black or African American, 35.9% White, 0.5% Asian, 0.3% Native American, 5.9% of some other race and 1.3% of two or more races. 9.5% were Hispanic or Latino (of any race).

As of the census of 2000, there were 45,087 people, 15,867 households, and 11,424 families living in the county. There were 17,703 housing units at an average density of 34 per square mile (13/km2). The racial makeup of the county was 57.14% Black or African American, 38.70% White, 0.23% Native American, 0.26% Asian, 0.02% Pacific Islander, 2.76% from other races, and 0.89% from two or more races.  6.17% of the population were Hispanic or Latino of any race.

There were 15,867 households, out of which 32.60% had children under the age of 18 living with them, 44.50% were married couples living together, 22.50% had a female householder with no husband present, and 28.00% were non-families. 23.90% of all households were made up of individuals, and 9.50% had someone living alone who was 65 years of age or older.  The average household size was 2.69 and the average family size was 3.18.

In the county, the population was spread out, with 26.40% under the age of 18, 9.50% from 18 to 24, 28.90% from 25 to 44, 23.00% from 45 to 64, and 12.20% who were 65 years of age or older.  The median age was 36 years. For every 100 females, there were 90.70 males.  For every 100 females age 18 and over, there were 86.50 males.

The median income for a household in the county was $31,248, and the median income for a family was $36,238. Males had a median income of $27,159 versus $21,721 for females. The per capita income for the county was $14,499.  About 16.40% of families and 19.90% of the population were below the poverty line, including 28.50% of those under age 18 and 16.90% of those age 65 or over.

Education

The Gadsden County School District, the only school district, operates public schools.

Gadsden County is home to one public high school, Gadsden County High School (formerly East Gadsden High School), formed in 2017 by the merger of East Gadsden High and the high school portion of West Gadsden High School; the West Gadsden High building was converted to West Gadsden Middle. West Gadsden was formed by the merger of the former Chattahoochee High and Greensboro High and was located on the western outskirts of Quincy near Greensboro. East Gadsden, formed by the merger of James A. Shanks High and Havana Northside High, was located on Hwy. 90 east of Quincy.

Robert F. Munroe Day School and Tallavanna Christian School are private schools in the county that were founded as segregation academies.

Libraries
The Gadsden County Public Library System has 3 branches.
 William A. McGill Library
 Havana Branch
 Chattahoochee Branch

Politics

Voter registration
According to the Secretary of State's office, Democrats maintain a massive majority of registered voters in Gadsden County. As of May 23, 2022, the county has the highest percentage of registered Democrats of all counties in Florida. The last Republican to win a majority in the county was Richard Nixon in his landslide 1972 victory, and Gadsden was the solitary Florida county to vote against Reagan in 1984 and George Bush in 1988.

Statewide elections

COUNTY COMMISSIONERS
 Eric Hinson (District 1)
 Anthony Viegbesie, PhD (District 2)
 Kimblin NeSmith, J.D (District 3)
Brenda Holt (District 4)
 Ronterious Green (District 5)
LOCAL ELECTED OFFICIALS 
 Sheriff: Morris A. Young
 Supervisor of Elections: Shirley Green Knight
 Tax Collector: W. Dale Summerford
 Property Appraiser: Reginald Cunningham
 Superintendent of Schools: Elijah Key

Transportation

Airports
 Quincy Municipal Airport

Major roads

  Interstate 10 is the main west-to-east interstate highway in the county, and serves as the unofficial dividing line between northern and southern Gadsden County. It contains four interchanges within the county; CR 270A (Exit 166), SR 12 (Exit 174), SR 267 (Exit 181), and US 90 (Exit 192).
  US 90 was the main west-to-east highway in the county prior to the construction of I-10 in the late 1960s. It runs from the Victory Bridge in Chatahoochee in the northwest, and then southeast through Gretna, Douglas City, and Quincy before finally leaving the county east of Midway into Leon County.
  US 27 is the sole south-to-north U.S. highway running through the northeastern part of the county.
  State Road 12 is a west-to-east state highway running from Liberty County in the southwest to Havana in the northeast. It also contains a county extension into Leon County.
  State Road 65 
  State Road 159 is a short south to north road connecting US 27 to SR 12 in Havana, with a county extension northwest to Georgia State Route 309 at the Georgia State Line.
  State Road 267

Railroads
Gadsden County has at least four existing railroad lines, three of which are owned by CSX. The first two CSX lines being P&A Subdivision, a line formerly owned by the Louisville and Nashville Railroad, and the other is the Tallahassee Subdivision, a former Seaboard Air Line Railroad line. These two lines meet in Chatahoochee and served Amtrak's Sunset Limited until it was truncated to New Orleans in 2005 by Hurricane Katrina. A third line is the Apalachicola Northern Railroad, a line that spans as far south as Port St. Joe. The line enters from Liberty County, then crosses SR 12 in Greensboro, runs under I-10, follows CR 268 in Hardaway, and then turns west into Chatahoochee. The fourth line is the third CSX Line, the Bainbridge Subdivision, which runs along the west side of US 27 from Leon County by way of a bridge over the Ochlockonee River to the Georgia State Line. While some spurs still exist, other lines within the county were abandoned.

Public transportation
Public Transportation is provided by Big Bend Transit, which operates 3 bus routes in the county.

Communities

Cities
 Chattahoochee
 Gretna
 Midway
 Quincy

Towns
 Havana
 Greensboro

Unincorporated areas

 Dogtown
 Hinson
 Jamieson
 Lake Tallavana
 Mount Pleasant
 Oak Grove
 Reston
 St. Hebron
 St. John
 Scotland
 Scottown
 Wetumpka

Gallery

See also
 National Register of Historic Places listings in Gadsden County, Florida

References

External links

Government links/Constitutional offices
 Gadsden County Board of County Commissioners
 Gadsden County Supervisor of Elections
 Gadsden County Property Appraiser
 Gadsden County Sheriff's Office
 Gadsden County Tax Collector

Special districts
 Gadsden County Schools
 Northwest Florida Water Management District

Judicial branch
 Gadsden County Clerk of Courts
  Public Defender, 2nd Judicial Circuit of Florida serving  Franklin, Gadsden, Jefferson, Leon, Liberty, and Wakulla counties
  Office of the State Attorney, 2nd Judicial Circuit of Florida
  Circuit and County Court for the 2nd Judicial Circuit of Florida

Tourism links
 Gadsden County Chamber of Commerce
 RiverWay South, FL regional tourism website
 Official Gadsden County Tourism website

 
1832 establishments in Florida Territory
Populated places established in 1832
Florida counties
Tallahassee metropolitan area
North Florida